Stray Dogs is a 1989 Soviet drama thriller directed by .

Plot 
The film tells about hunters who go to an abandoned city to kill wolves, whose victims are residents of this city, and instead of wolves they find cannibal dogs there.

Cast 
 Sergey Kokovkin
 Andrey Krasko
 Aleksey Krychenkov
 Yuri Kuznetsov
 Mikhail Zhigalov

References

External links 
 

1989 films
1980s Russian-language films
Soviet science fiction films
Soviet post-apocalyptic films
1989 science fiction films